The 1998 ASB Classic was a women's tennis tournament played on outdoor hard courts at the ASB Tennis Centre in Auckland in New Zealand that was part of Tier IV of the 1998 WTA Tour. The tournament was held from 5 January until 10 January 1998. Third-seeded Dominique Van Roost won the singles title and earned $17,700 first-prize money.

Finals

Singles

 Dominique Van Roost defeated  Silvia Farina, 4–6, 7–6(11–9), 7–5
 It was Van Roost's 1st title of the year and the 6th of her career.

Doubles

 Nana Miyagi /  Tamarine Tanasugarn defeated  Julie Halard-Decugis /  Janette Husárová, 7–6(7–1), 6–4
 It was Miyagi's 1st title of the year and the 8th of her career. It was Tanasugarn's only title of the year and the 1st of her career.

Prize money

See also
 1998 Heineken Open – men's tournament

References

External links
 Tournament draws

ASB Classic
WTA Auckland Open
ASB
ASB
1998 in New Zealand tennis